Cnx1 may refer to:
 Molybdopterin adenylyltransferase
 Molybdopterin molybdotransferase